Blues in the Closet may refer to:

"Blues in the Closet", a composition, also known as "Collard Greens and Black Eyed Peas", by Harry Babasin and Oscar Pettiford
Blues in the Closet (Bud Powell album), 1956
Blues in the Closet (Tommy Flanagan album), 1983